SS Bosnia was an Italian cargo liner built in the 1890s that was shelled and sunk by a German submarine in the Mediterranean during World War I.

Description

Construction and career
The ship was built in 1898 by the shipbuilding company Gio. Ansaldo & C. at their Sestri Ponente, Genoa shipyard, with the yard number of 113. She was constructed for the Italian shipping company Navigazione Generale Italiana. By 1915 Bosnia was owned by the Societa Italiana Di Servizi Marittimi, based in Venice. On 3 March the ship pulled off the French armored cruiser  after the warship had run aground under enemy fire off Dedeagatch, Bulgaria. The sinking of Bosnia on 10 November 1915 caused the loss of 12 of the ship's crewmen. At the time of her sinking, she was carrying general cargo.

Notes

References

External links

SS Bosnia  at wrecksite.eu

1898 ships
Ships built by Gio. Ansaldo & C.
Cargo liners
Steamships of Italy
World War I merchant ships of Italy
Ships sunk by German submarines in World War I
World War I shipwrecks in the Mediterranean Sea
Maritime incidents in 1915